Autophile may also refer to:

 Self-love
 Automotive enthusiast